Stanówka is a small river of Poland, a tributary of the Bystrzyca at Ulan-Majorat.

Rivers of Poland
Rivers of Lublin Voivodeship